In structural engineering, the plastic moment (Mp) is a property of a structural section. It is defined as the moment at which the entire cross section has reached its yield stress. This is theoretically the maximum bending moment that the section can resist – when this point is reached a plastic hinge is formed and any load beyond this point will result in theoretically infinite plastic deformation. In practice most materials are work-hardened resulting in increased stiffness and moment resistance until the material fails. This is of little significance in structural mechanics as the deflection prior to this occurring is considered to be an earlier failure point in the member.

In general, the method to calculate  first requires calculation of the plastic section modulus  and then to substitute this into the following formula:

 

For example, the plastic moment for a rectangular section can be calculated with the following formula:

 

where

  is the width
  is the height 
  is the yield stress

The plastic moment for a given section will always be larger than the yield moment (the bending moment at which the first part of the sections reaches the yield stress).

See also
Structural engineering theory
Plasticity (physics)

References

Building engineering